The goldenrod soldier beetle or Pennsylvania leatherwing (Chauliognathus pensylvanicus) is a species of soldier beetle (Cantharidae).

Nomenclature
The specific epithet  is Latin for "of Pennsylvania". The spelling with one n was in common use at the time (de Geer says in the description that the specimen was sent to him from 'Pensylvanie'), so the species name based on it cannot be corrected under the rules governing scientific names.

Distribution
The species is native to North America, and is one of the most common species of soldier beetle in the Midwest.

Ecology 
C. pensylvanicus has been identified as an important pollinator of the prairie onion.

Parasites
Adult C. pensylvanicus may be infected by the fungus Eryniopsis lampyridarum. After the fungus infects the host, it takes about two weeks for it to eventually kill its host. Before the host dies, the fungus orders the beetle to climb a plant and then attach itself to a flower by biting down with its mandibles into flower heads. About 15–22 hours later, the fungus causes the dead beetles to raise their elytra and expand their metathoracic wings in order to maximise infection of other beetles. With their wings raised, the dead beetles may still attract mates as live males were observed mating with the deceased, infected females, this then transmits spores from one insect-host to another.

References

External links
Soldier Beetles. Family Cantharidae, Canadian Bioversity

Beetles of North America
Cantharidae
Beetles described in 1774